Emilie Chandler (born 29 April 1983) is a French politician from Agir. She has been Member of Parliament for Val-d'Oise's 1st constituency since 2022.

References

See also 

 List of deputies of the 16th National Assembly of France

Living people
1983 births
Members of Parliament for Val-d'Oise
Deputies of the 16th National Assembly of the French Fifth Republic
21st-century French politicians
21st-century French women politicians
Women members of the National Assembly (France)
Agir (France) politicians